The Yale Bulldogs men's soccer team represented Yale University during the 1928 ISFA season. It was the Bulldogs's 23rd season as a varsity program, and the second season of Walter Leeman at the helm. The Bulldogs won their first undisputed national title, winning the 1928 Collegiate title. This was Yale's fourth ever national championship for men's soccer.

Known players 

The entire roster for the 1928 team is unknown. John Whitelaw served as the team's captain during the 1928 season.

Schedule 

|-
!colspan=6 style=""| Regular season

|-

References 

Yale
1928
1928
Yale Bulldogs men's soccer team